Menashe Kadishman (Hebrew: מנשה קדישמן; August 21, 1932 – May 8, 2015) was an Israeli sculptor and painter.

Biography

Menashe Kadishman was born in Mandate Palestine in the family of two Zionist (supporters of the state of Israel as the Jewish homeland), Bilha and Ben-Zion Kadishman. His father died when he was 15 years old. He left school to help his mother and provide for the family.

From 1947 to 1950, Kadishman studied with the Israeli sculptor Moshe Sternschuss at the Avni Institute of Art and Design in Tel Aviv, and in 1954 with the Israeli sculptor Rudi Lehmann in Jerusalem.
 
In 1950, Kadishman joined the Nahal infantry brigade and he worked as a shepherd on Kibbutz Ma'ayan Baruch for the next three years. This experience with nature, sheep and shepherding had a significant impact on his later artistic work and career.

In 1959, Kadishman moved to London to study at Saint Martin's School of Art and the Slade School of Art.  In 1959-1960 he also studied with Anthony Caro and Reg Butler. He  had his first one-man show there in 1965 at the Grosvenor Gallery. In  1972, he returned to Israel.

On May 8, 2015 Kadishman died at Sheba Medical Center in Tel Hashomer.

Art career

In the 1960s, Kadishman's sculptures were Minimalist in style, and so designed as to appear to defy gravity. This was achieved either through careful balance and construction, as in Suspense (1966), or by using glass and metal so that the metal appeared unsupported, as in Segments (1968). The glass allowed the environment to be part of the work.

The first major appearance of sheep in his work was at the 1978 Venice Biennale, where Kadishman presented a flock of colored live sheep as living art. In 1995, he began painting portraits of sheep  by the hundreds, and even thousands, each one different from the next. These instantly-recognizable sheep portraits soon became his artistic "trademark".

Awards and recognition
 1960 the America-Israel Cultural Foundation Scholarship.
 1961, the Sainsbury Scholarship, London.
 1967 first prize for sculpture, 5th Paris Biennale.
 1978 Sandberg Prize recipient
 1980 America-Israel Cultural Foundation Scholarship 
 1981 Eugene Kolb Prize for Israeli Graphic Arts, Tel Aviv Museum Prize of the Jury
 1981 Norwegian International Print Biennale, Fredrikstad.
 1984 Mendel Pundik Prize for Israeli Art, Tel Aviv Museum 
 1990 the Dizengoff Prize for Sculpture.
 1995 the Israel Prize, for sculpture.
 2002 the Honorary Fellowship Award from the Tel Aviv Museum of Art.

Sculptures and public installations

United States 

 New York
 'Suspended', 1977, Storm King Art Center, Mountainville
 'Eight Positive Trees', 1977, Storm King Art Center, Mountainville
 'Sheep', 1979, The Jewish Museum, New York, NY
 'Untitled', 1981, The Jewish Museum, New York, NY
 'Shepherdess', 1984, The Jewish Museum, New York, NY
'The Sacrifice of Isaac', 1985, Hebrew Home at Riverdale, Bronx, NY

 Oklahoma
 'The Sacrifice of Isaac', 1985, Fred Jones Jr. Museum of Art, Norman
 'Negative Tree', 2001, Philbrook Museum of Art, Tulsa
 'Tree #1 (Positive)', 2001, Quartz Mountain Arts & Conference Center, Lone Wolf
 'Tree #2 (Negative)', 2001, Quartz Mountain Arts & Conference Center, Lone Wolf

 Pennsylvania
 'Three Discs', 1967, Susquehanna University, Selinsgrove
 'The Sacrifice of Isaac', 1986, Lehigh University, Bethlehem

 Texas
 'Segments', 1968, Nasher Sculpture Center, Dallas
 'The Forest', 1970, Nasher Sculpture Center, Dallas
 'Om', 1969, University of Houston, Houston

Canada 
  
 'Three Discs', 1967, High Park, Toronto

Costa Rica 
 MADC Museo de Arte y Diseño Contemporáneo, San José

Italy 
 Morning Light (sheep+ sheep), Fattoria di Celle- Collezione Gori, Pistoia, Italy

Germany 

 'Falling Leaves', Jewish Museum, Berlin
 'Pieta', Dominikanerkloster, Braunschweig
 'Negative Trees', 1974, Wedau Sports Park, Duisburg

Israel 
 1957 "The Dog", Artist Private Collection | 2015 China, Sculptor Maty Grunberg, recreating Kadishman "The Dog 1957" in granite stone, under M. Kadishman's instruction
 1960 Tension, Israel Museum, Jerusalem

 1964 Uprise, a heavy steel sculpture near the Theatre and Performing Arts Center stage. Tel Aviv
 1966 In Suspense,  Israel Museum, Jerusalem
 1967 In Suspense, Weizmann Institute of Science, Rehovot
 1967-74 The Tree Circles, Tel Aviv
 1975 In Suspense, University of Tel Aviv, TelAviv
 1975 In Suspense, Tel Aviv Museum of Art, Tel Aviv-Yafo
 1977 Circles, The Hebrew University, Har Hatsofim, Jerusalem
 1979 Continuum, Weizmann Institute of Science, Rehovot
 1982-1985 Akedat Issac, Tel Aviv Art Museum, Tel Aviv
 1984 - Hill of the Sheep, The Tefen Open Museum of Israeli Art, Galilee
 1985 Akedat Issac, University of Tel, Tel Aviv-Yafo
 1985, Trees Israel Museum Billy Rose Sculpture Art Garden, Jerusalem, Israel
 1989 Birth, The Open Museum of Israeli Art, Galilee
 1990 Trees, Rehavia, Jerusalem
 1990 Birth, near the Herzliya Museum of Contemporary Art. Herzliya
 1994 Motherland, Lola Beer Ebner Sculpture Garden, Tel Aviv Museum of Art, Tel Aviv-Yafo
 1995 The Family Plaza, The International School for Holocaust Studies, Yad Veshem, Jerusalem
 1998 Scream, Lola Beer Ebner Sculpture Garden, Tel Aviv Museum of Art, Tel Aviv-Yafo
 2004 Portrait of Shimon Finkel on the facade of Tel Aviv City Hall
 2006 Memorial monument for the Etzel, Haganah and Lehi underground organizations, Ramat Gan

Japan 
 'Prometheus', 1986–87, Hara Museum of Contemporary Art, Tokyo

The Netherlands 

 'Dream', 1993, Buddingh'plein, Dordrecht
‘Sacrifice of Isaac’, Vlaszak, Breda.

United Kingdom 
 Tate Britain, London (England)
 Hollyfield, Harlow (England)

Other works 
 'Horse'
 'Motherland'
 'Child and Horse'
 'Kissing Birds'
 'Homage to Young Couples'
 'Homage to Barnett Newman'
 'The Flock'
 'Cracked Earth'

See also 
 List of Israel Prize recipients
Visual arts in Israel

References 

1932 births
2015 deaths
Modern sculptors
Jewish painters
Jewish sculptors
Israel Prize in sculpture recipients
Sandberg Prize recipients
Jewish Israeli artists
Israeli contemporary artists
Artists from Tel Aviv
Alumni of Saint Martin's School of Art
20th-century Israeli male artists
21st-century Israeli male artists
20th-century Israeli painters
20th-century Israeli sculptors
21st-century Israeli painters
21st-century Israeli sculptors